Hattori Hunzo is a reclusive Japanese hip hop producer, multi-instrumentalist and mixing engineer. There are no known pictures of him.

He is best known for his work as a producer with Bliss n Eso on the Flying Colours album, which won an Aria award for Best Urban Release 2008 and achieved Gold record status. He features on the group's latest album, Running On Air, with the RZA, Xzibit, Kasey Chambers and M-Phazes. The album debuted at number one on the ARIA Charts and has since been certified Gold.

His production style is identified by 'an intricate amalgamation of live instrumentation and sample based production that crescendos into a song that soars.'

Bliss n Eso's most recent single "Down By The River" was produced by Hunzo. It has been their most well received song to date by radio, placing 4th on the most added tracks to radio chart during the week of its release. In July the group released a track online for free download. The track, called "Golden Years", was also produced by Hunzo, with co-production from Bliss.

The tracks "Smoke Like A Fire", which features the RZA, and "People Up On It", featuring Xzibit, were both produced by Hunzo: 'so impressive is the record's hip hop smarts that the group managed to attract guest verses from LA rap heavyweight Xzibit and burning slot from none other than Wu-Tang Clan founder RZA on the stomping Hunzo beat Smoke Like a Fire.'

References

External links
 Official website
 Hattori Hunzo on Facebook

Living people
Year of birth missing (living people)